"The Power of the Dog" is a quote from Psalm 22 of the Book of Psalms.

The Power of the Dog may also refer to:
 The Power of the Dog, 1910–11 dog breed guide by Arthur Croxton Smith and illustrated by Maud Earl
 The Power of the Dog (Savage novel), 1967 novel by Thomas Savage
 The Power of the Dog (film), 2021 film adaptation of Savage's novel
 The Power of the Dog (Winslow novel), 2005 novel by Don Winslow